Antalya Expo Center is an indoor arena in Antalya, Turkey. The Expo Center was founded in 1999 by Antalya Fair Management and Investment Inc. It has a seating capacity for 3,800 people for sports events.

The arena hosted some games of the first stages of Eurobasket 2001 and the 2010 World Weightlifting Championships on September 17–26.

References

External links
Official website
Information from Eurobasket 2001 official website

Indoor arenas in Turkey
Sports venues completed in 1999
Expo Center
Fairgrounds in Turkey
1999 establishments in Turkey